Sulev Teppart (born on 13 September 1960 in Viljandi) is an Estonian actor.

In 1982 he graduated from the Tallinn State Conservatory's Performing Arts Department. From 1982 until 1985, he worked at the Estonian Youth Theatre, and from 1985 until 2006, at the Estonian Drama Theatre. Since 2006 he has been a freelance actor. Besides theatre roles he has played in films and on television. Teppart was married to actress Anu Lamp. The couple had three sons, including actors Jaak Prints and Tõnn Lamp. They later divorced

Awards:
 1981: Voldemar Panso prize

Filmography

 1988: Õnnelik lapsepõlv
 1992: Need vanad armastuskirjad
 2006: Meeletu
 2010: Oleg
 2011: Üks mu sõber
 2013: Elavad pildid 
 2016: Perekonnavaled
 2022: Kalev

References

Living people
1960 births
Estonian male stage actors
Estonian male film actors
Estonian male television actors
20th-century Estonian male actors
21st-century Estonian male actors
Estonian Academy of Music and Theatre alumni
People from Viljandi